Neil Tarrant (born 24 June 1979) is a footballer who played for a variety of British clubs including Ross County, Aston Villa and Ayr United, and the Scotland national under-21 football team.

Club career
Tarrant signed for Shamrock Rovers in August 1997 but only made 2 substitute appearances before being released in November. He made his debut on 17 October at the Hoops temporary home at the time Tolka Park.

Tarrant won the Scottish Third Division at Ross County in 1998-99 and was voted SPFA Players' Player of the Year for the Third Division that season. He holds the record for the highest transfer fee received in the Scottish Third Division at a reported  from when he moved to Aston Villa.

In his time at Ayr United, Tarrant reached the Scottish Cup semi-final.

He went on to win the Football Conference in 2001-02 whilst playing for Boston United.

International career
Tarrant won five caps for the Scotland national under-21 football team.

References

External links

1979 births
Living people
Scottish footballers
Darlington F.C. players
English Football League players
Northern Premier League players
Northern Football League players
League of Ireland players
Scottish Football League players
Scottish Premier League players
Shamrock Rovers F.C. players
Ross County F.C. players
Aston Villa F.C. players
Ayr United F.C. players
York City F.C. players
Motherwell F.C. players
Boston United F.C. players
Barrow A.F.C. players
Drogheda United F.C. players
Raufoss IL players
Workington A.F.C. players
Gateshead F.C. players
Newcastle Blue Star F.C. players
Sunderland Nissan F.C. players
Dunston UTS F.C. players
Northallerton Town F.C. players
Darlington Railway Athletic F.C. players
Scotland under-21 international footballers
Scottish expatriate footballers
Expatriate footballers in Norway
Scottish expatriate sportspeople in Norway
Norwegian First Division players
Association football forwards